In six-dimensional geometry, a rectified 6-cube is a convex uniform 6-polytope, being a rectification of the regular 6-cube.

There are unique 6 degrees of rectifications, the zeroth being the 6-cube, and the 6th and last being the 6-orthoplex. Vertices of the rectified 6-cube are located at the edge-centers of the 6-cube. Vertices of the birectified 6-cube are located in the square face centers of the 6-cube.

Rectified 6-cube

Alternate names
 Rectified hexeract (acronym: rax) (Jonathan Bowers)

Construction 
The rectified 6-cube may be constructed from the 6-cube by truncating its vertices at the midpoints of its edges.

Coordinates
The Cartesian coordinates of the vertices of the rectified 6-cube with edge length  are all permutations of:

Images

Birectified 6-cube

Alternate names
 Birectified hexeract (acronym: brox) (Jonathan Bowers)
 Rectified 6-demicube

Construction 
The birectified 6-cube may be constructed from the 6-cube by truncating its vertices at the midpoints of its edges.

Coordinates
The Cartesian coordinates of the vertices of the rectified 6-cube with edge length  are all permutations of:

Images

Related polytopes

These polytopes are part of a set of 63 uniform 6-polytopes generated from the B6 Coxeter plane, including the regular 6-cube or 6-orthoplex.

Notes

References 
 H.S.M. Coxeter: 
 H.S.M. Coxeter, Regular Polytopes, 3rd Edition, Dover New York, 1973 
 Kaleidoscopes: Selected Writings of H.S.M. Coxeter, edited by F. Arthur Sherk, Peter McMullen, Anthony C. Thompson, Asia Ivic Weiss, Wiley-Interscience Publication, 1995,  
 (Paper 22) H.S.M. Coxeter, Regular and Semi Regular Polytopes I, [Math. Zeit. 46 (1940) 380-407, MR 2,10]
 (Paper 23) H.S.M. Coxeter, Regular and Semi-Regular Polytopes II, [Math. Zeit. 188 (1985) 559-591]
 (Paper 24) H.S.M. Coxeter, Regular and Semi-Regular Polytopes III, [Math. Zeit. 200 (1988) 3-45]
 Norman Johnson Uniform Polytopes, Manuscript (1991)
 N.W. Johnson: The Theory of Uniform Polytopes and Honeycombs, Ph.D. 
  o3x3o3o3o4o - rax, o3o3x3o3o4o - brox,

External links 
 
 Polytopes of Various Dimensions
 Multi-dimensional Glossary

6-polytopes